Dietrich Weise (21 November 1934 – 20 December 2020) was a German footballer and football manager.

Career
He coached 1. FC Kaiserslautern, Eintracht Frankfurt, Fortuna Düsseldorf, Germany (youth), Al-Ahly, Egypt and Liechtenstein.

References

1934 births
2020 deaths
People from Teuchern
People from the Province of Saxony
German footballers
Footballers from Saxony-Anhalt
Eintracht Frankfurt players
Rot-Weiss Frankfurt players
1. FSV Mainz 05 players
German football managers
German expatriate football managers
1. FC Kaiserslautern managers
Eintracht Frankfurt managers
Fortuna Düsseldorf managers
Al Ahly SC managers
Egypt national football team managers
Expatriate football managers in Egypt
Expatriate football managers in Liechtenstein
Liechtenstein national football team managers
Bundesliga managers
Association football forwards
West German footballers
West German expatriate football managers
West German football managers
West German expatriate sportspeople in Egypt
German expatriate sportspeople in Egypt
German expatriate sportspeople in Liechtenstein